Thirukoilur division is a revenue division in the Kallakurichi District Kallakurichi District of Tamil Nadu, India.

References 
 

Viluppuram district